Stanley Eugene Storton (born 5 January 1939) is an English former football player and manager.

Personal life
Born in Keighley, Storton is the older brother of fellow professional player Trevor Storton. Following his management career, Storton ran an office cleaning firm in Ellesmere Port.

Career

Playing career
Storton, who played as a full back, began his career at Huddersfield Town as an amateur. He turned professional in 1959, appearing in the Football League for Bradford City, Darlington, Hartlepool United and Tranmere Rovers, before dropping into non-league football with Ellesmere Port Town.

Coaching career
After retiring as a player, Storton managed a number teams including Ellesmere Port Town, Runcorn, Bangor City, Northwich Victoria and Telford United.

Honours
Individual
Football Conference Manager of the Month: October 1986

References

1939 births
Living people
English footballers
English football managers
Huddersfield Town A.F.C. players
Bradford City A.F.C. players
Darlington F.C. players
Hartlepool United F.C. players
Tranmere Rovers F.C. players
Ellesmere Port Town F.C. players
English Football League players
Ellesmere Port Town F.C. managers
Runcorn F.C. Halton managers
Bangor City F.C. managers
Northwich Victoria F.C. managers
Telford United F.C. managers
People from Ellesmere Port
Association football fullbacks